Naked City may refer to:

Literature
Naked City, a 1945 book of photographs by Weegee

Entertainment
 The Naked City, a 1948 film noir inspired by Weegee's book
 Naked City (TV series), a television series inspired by the film, first broadcast in 1958
 Naked City: Justice with a Bullet, a 1998 crime film intended as a reboot of the TV series
 Naked City (1993 TV series), a British music program on Channel 4

Music
Naked City (band), an avant-garde group fronted by John Zorn
Naked City (album), a 1990 album by Zorn featuring the band
Naked City: The Complete Studio Recordings, a box set by the band
Naked City, an album by Jeff Golub and Avenue Blue
"Naked City", a song by Kiss from Unmasked
"Naked City", a song by The Skatalites from Foundation Ska

Travel
Naked City, a naturist resort now known as Sun Aura, near Roselawn, Indiana, U.S.
Village Naturiste or "Naked City", a naturist resort in Cap d'Agde, France
Naked City, Las Vegas, A neighborhood in Las Vegas known for crime and drugs